is a Japanese singer and actress. Kikkawa achieved early fame portraying Kobeni Hanasaki from Kirarin Revolution Stage 3 and later debuted as a solo singer with the song, "Kikkake wa You!"

Career

2006–2010: Pre-debut, Kirarin Revolution
Kikkawa auditioned for Morning Musume's 8th generation in 2006 and was one of six finalists out of 6,883 applicants. Despite not making the group, she was accepted into Hello! Project's trainee group, Hello Pro Egg, in 2007. Prior to joining, she had done minor theatre work.

In 2008, Kikkawa provided the voice to Kobeni Hanasaki in Kirarin Revolution Stage 3. She became part of the in-show subgroup MilkyWay with Koharu Kusumi from Morning Musume and Sayaka Kitahara from Hello Pro Egg. Kikkawa also released songs for the soundtrack under the name "Kobeni Hanasaki starring You Kikkawa." She also made televised and concert appearances portraying Kobeni in real life.

2011–present: Solo debut
In 2011, Kikkawa debuted as a solo singer with the song "Kikkake wa You!"

She appeared in the 2011 film Cheerfu11y.

In 2013, she played the role of Chava in the Japanese production of Fiddler on the Roof.

On May 6, 2015, Kikkawa releases her 9th single, "Hana", which is the longest single among idol artists in Japan, with about 17 and a half minutes in length, with strong influences of Takarazuka.

Discography

Albums

Studio albums

Compilation albums

Cover albums

Singles

Regular singles

Digital singles

Filmography
 Dad, Chibi is Gone (2019)

Film

Television

Tours

References

External links
 
  
 Up-Front agency profile 
 Universal J official profile 

1992 births
Japanese idols
Hello! Project members
Living people
Universal Music Japan artists
Japanese women pop singers
Japanese voice actresses
Voice actresses from Ibaraki Prefecture
Musicians from Ibaraki Prefecture
Up-Front Group